The Château des Chauveaux is a château in Douzillac, Dordogne, Aquitaine, France.

Châteaux in Dordogne